Orbicular jasper is a variety of jasper which contains variably-colored orbs or spherical inclusions or zones. In highly silicified rhyolite or tuff, quartz and feldspar crystallize in radial aggregates of needle-like crystals which provide the basis or seed for the orbicular structure seen in this kind of jasper. The material is quite attractive when polished and is used as an ornamental stone or gemstone. 

Various local or commercial names have been used for the material, such as kinradite, oregonite, owyhee jasper, ocean jasper and poppy-patterned jasper, depending on the source. Poppy-patterned jasper or poppy jasper is the varietal name for material from several locations, but the most well known is from Morgan Hill, Santa Clara County, California.  The trade name ocean jasper is used for a variety found along the intertidal shores of northeast Madagascar. In Nebraska orbicular jasper is found in altered rhyolite beds noted for a variety of jaspers and related agates.

Also orbicular jasper (like Ocean jasper) has been found in a new location in Bulgaria in early 2017 by Nikolaos Dafnis and Asimina Sklari and they gave the trade name Bulgarian "Orbicular Arda Jasper TM"

Gallery

Bulgarian "Orbicular Arda jasper TM"

References

External links
R. V. Dietrich - Gemrocks
Mindat with location data
Agate variety names - University of Nebraska-Lincoln
USGS - jasper and other volcanic materials from Nebraska

Jasper
Geology of California